Hypomyces cervinigenus is a parasitic ascomycete fungus that grows on elfin saddle (Helvella) mushrooms in Europe and North America. It was described as new to science in 1971 by Clark Rogerson and Horace Simms. The type collection was made in Pierce County, Washington, where the fungus was found growing on the stipe and cap of what they identified as a fruit body of Helvella lacunosa; later molecular work demonstrated that the European H. lacunosa is not found in North America, and that the North American versions are in fact two similar species, H. vespertina and H. dryophila. H. cervinigenus has perithecia that are white to pale buff with a waxy texture. The ascospores are two-celled, smooth-walled, and measure less than 25 µm long. The anamorph form of the fungus is known as Mycogone cervina.

References

Fungi described in 1971
Fungi of Europe
Fungi of North America
Hypocreaceae
Parasitic fungi